Afraltha chionostola, the learner slug, is a species of moths in the genus Afraltha. It’s in the family Limacodidae and in the subfamily Limacodinae.

Distribution 
Afraltha chionostola occurs in Angola, Botswana, DR Congo, Malawi, Namibia, South Africa, Zambia and Zimbabwe.

References 

Moths described in 1910
Taxa named by George Hampson
Insects of Angola
Insects of Botswana
Insects of the Democratic Republic of the Congo
Insects of Malawi
Insects of Namibia
Insects of South Africa
Insects of Zambia
Insects of Zimbabwe
chionostola
Limacodinae